1994 World Championships may refer to:

 1994 World Aquatics Championships
 1994 World Artistic Gymnastics Championships
 1994 World Artistic Gymnastics Championships (Team)
 1994 World Junior Championships in Athletics
 1994 FIBA World Championship in basketball
 1994 FIBA World Championship for Women in basketball
 Biathlon World Championships 1994
 1994 UCI Road World Championships in bicycle road racing
 FIBT World Championships 1994 in bobsleigh and skeleton 
 1994 ICF Canoe Sprint World Championships
 1994 IAAF World Cross Country Championships
 1994 World Men's Curling Championship
 1994 World Women's Curling Championship
 1994 BDO World Darts Championship
 1994 WDC World Darts Championship
 1994 World Fencing Championships
 1994 World Figure Skating Championships
 1994 IAAF World Half Marathon Championships
 1994 Men's World Ice Hockey Championships
 1994 IIHF Women's World Championship in ice hockey
 1994 World Junior Ice Hockey Championships
 FIL World Luge Natural Track Championships 1994
 1994 World Rhythmic Gymnastics Championships
 FIS Ski-Flying World Championships 1994
 1994 World Snooker Championship
 1994 ISF Women's World Championship in softball
 1994 Individual Speedway World Championship
 1994 Individual Speedway Junior World Championship
 1994 Superbike World Championship season
 1994 ATP Tour World Championships in tennis
 1994 Trampoline World Championships
 1994 ITU Triathlon World Championships
 1994 FIVB Men's Volleyball World Championship
 1994 FIVB Women's World Championship in volleyball
 1994 World Weightlifting Championships
 1994 World Wrestling Championships
 1994 Star World Championships in yachting